Marie de Régnier (20 December 1875 – 6 February 1963), also known by her maiden name Marie de Heredia or her pen-name Gérard d'Houville, was a French novelist and poet, and closely involved in the artistic circles of early twentieth-century Paris.

Biography
Marie de Heredia was the second of three daughters of Cuban-born French poet José-Maria de Heredia, and from an early age she mixed with many writers and artists that came to her father's house, including Leconte de Lisle, Anna de Noailles, Paul Valéry, Pierre Louÿs and Anatole France.

Her private life was somewhat convoluted. She married poet Henri de Régnier, but had a long-term relationship with Pierre Louÿs, who was probably the father of her son Pierre de Régnier (1898–1943). She also took several other lovers, including Edmond Jaloux, Jean-Louis Vaudoyer, Gabriele D'Annunzio (during his exile in Paris from 1910 to 1914), and dramatist Henri Bernstein. Her association with openly lesbian colleagues also led to rumours about her own sexuality.

Works
Though sometimes better known for her liaisons with other artists, Marie de Régnier was a very accomplished poet and novelist in her own right, "considered one of the most gifted of the bevy of women writers that her age produced". Her first attempts at poetry were written at the Bibliothèque de l'Arsenal, where her father was a director. He and his friends encouraged her talents from a very young age, and she eventually began publishing under her married name, later taking the masculine-sounding pseudonym "Gérard d'Houville" (derived from the name of a Norman grandmother, "Louise Gérard d'Houville" or "Girard d'Ouville"). She later said her use of a pen-name was a way of distancing herself from her more famous husband and father, but it was not a serious attempt to disguise her sex: contemporary critics and commentators always referred to "Madame" Gérard d'Houville.

Her work appeared notably in the Revue des deux Mondes from 1894 and was widely admired, with some critics comparing her favourably to Mallarmé. Many of these poems have still not been collected into a modern edition. Her first novel, L'Inconstante, appeared in 1903.

Critical reception and legacy

De Heredia's work was acclaimed throughout her career and she was a popular writer with the public as well as critics. When French newspaper L'Intransigeant asked readers in 1910 to name the top three female writers deserving of a place in the Académie française, "Gérard d'Houville" was placed in top position, above Anna de Noailles and Colette. In 1918 she was the recipient of the Académie française's inaugural Grand Prix de Littérature, awarded for her fiction, and in 1958 she was also given the Académie's Grand Prix de Poésie for her poetic oeuvre – to this day the only woman to have received both awards.

Several artists and painters of the time took her portrait, including Jacques-Émile Blanche and Jean-Louis Forain. She was also the subject of several of Pierre Louÿs's nude photographs.

Select bibliography
 L'Inconstante, roman, 1903<ref>{{cite journal |title=Review of L'Inconstante by Gérard d'Houville|journal=The Athenaeum |issue=3940 |date=May 2, 1903|page=560|url=https://books.google.com/books?id=oKA5AQAAIAAJ&pg=PA560}}</ref>
 Esclave, 1905
 Le Temps d'aimer, 1908
 Le Séducteur, 1914
 Jeune Fille, 1916
 Tant pis pour toi, 1921
 Le Roman des quatre, 1923 (written in collaboration with Paul Bourget, Henri Duvernois and Pierre Benoit)
 Le Chou, 1924
 Vingt poèmes, 1925
 L'Enfant, 1925
 La Vie amoureuse de l'Impératrice Joséphine, 1925
 Clowns, 1925
 Paris et les voyages, 1925
 Chez le magicien, 1926
 Proprette et Cochonnet, 1926
 Opinions candides, 1926
 Je crois que je vous aime... Sept proverbes, 1927
 Esclave amoureuse, 1927
 La Vie amoureuse de la Belle Hélène, 1928
 Le Diadème de Flore, 1928
 Le Charmant Rendez-Vous, 1929
 Les Rêves de Rikiki, 1930
 Les Poésies, 1931
 L'Impératrice Joséphine, 1933
 Peau d'âme, 1935
 Le Temps d'aimer, 1935
 Enfantines et Amoureuses, 1946

Further reading
 Dominique Bona, Les yeux noirs : les vies extraordinaires des sœurs Heredia, J-C. Lattès, 1989
 Robert Fleury, Marie de Régnier, Plon, 1990
 Jean-Paul Goujon, Dossier secret : Pierre Louÿs-Marie de Régnier, Paris, Christian Bourgois, 2002
 Robert Fleury, Marie de Régnier, l'inconstante, Omnibus, 2003 
 Marie de Laubier (dir.), Une muse de la Belle Époque : Marie de Régnier, BNF, 2004 

Film
 2019 : Curiosa'', an erotic French movie directed by Lou Jeunet.

External links
Selected poems (in French)

References 

Writers from Paris
1875 births
1963 deaths
20th-century French poets
20th-century French novelists
Burials at Père Lachaise Cemetery
20th-century French women writers